This is a list of football (soccer) clubs in Benin.
For a complete list see :Category:Football clubs in Benin

A
Adjobi Football Club
Akanké FC
AS Dragons FC de l'Ouémé
ASPAC FC
Avrankou Omnisport FC

B
Buffles du Borgou FC
Dynamite force Benin city

D
Dynamo Abomey F.C.
Dynamo Unacob FC de Parakou

E
Espoir FC (Benin football club)

J
Jeunesse Athlétique du Plateau

M
Mambas Noirs FC
Mogas 90 FC

P
Panthères FC
Police

R
Requins de l'Atlantique FC

S
Seme Krake
Soleil FC

T
Tonnerre d'Abomey FC

Benin
Football clubs
 
Football clubs